The California School for the Deaf is a school for deaf children in Fremont, California. The school educates deaf children from all over Northern California.  Its campus in Fremont is adjacent to the campus of the California School for the Blind.

Its companion school in Southern California is CSD-Riverside.

History 

Founded in San Francisco in 1860, the school moved to Berkeley in 1869. The new site, constructed in 1869 at 2601 Warring St., Berkeley, CA, adjacent to the campus of the University of California, Berkeley, served as the school for the deaf until the late 1970s, when the University of California successfully petitioned for it to be condemned as seismically unsafe, forcing the school to move. A Daily Cal article on November 29, 1979, reported that the university administration had "coveted the Deaf and Blind School land for 57 years." Half of the school's land went to UC Berkeley, while the other half went to the city. After the location was taken over by the university, it was renamed Clark Kerr campus, in honor of the first chancellor of the University of California, Berkeley, and has served as an additional dormitory unit for its students.

The school opened in a new facility in Fremont, California in Fall 1980.

Henry Klopping became superintendent in 1975. By 2009 the staff became made up of predominantly deaf individuals when previously there were few in the administration.

Campus
The school has dormitories.

Notable alumni
 Robert R. Davila, ninth president of Gallaudet University
 Jack R. Gannon, teacher, coach, and author
 Granville Redmond
 Louise Stern, writer and artist
 Shoshannah Stern, actress
 Douglas Tilden

See also

References

 article about history of Berkeley campus of School for the Deaf

External links
 
 CSD Alumni Association Website

Bay Counties League
Schools in Fremont, California
High schools in Alameda County, California
Educational institutions established in 1860
Public K-12 schools in California
Schools for the deaf in the United States
1860 establishments in California
Public boarding schools in the United States
Boarding schools in California
Schools in San Francisco
Buildings and structures in Berkeley, California
Education in Berkeley, California